Benoît Bastien (born 17 April 1983) is a French professional football referee. He has been a full international for FIFA since 2014.

Controversies
Benoît Bastien is widely known in Romania for his wrong decisions against the Romanian teams CFR Cluj and FCSB. He was accused of racism and xenophobia to the Romanians by the fans of these clubs after multiple eronated decisions in two games involving the teams, some of them being described as ”intentional”.

Young Boys 2-1 CFR Cluj
The first incident took place on December 10, 2020, in the last matchday of the group stage of the UEFA Europa League season 2020-21. During a football match between the Swiss side Young Boys and the Romanian side CFR Cluj, he gave a penalty for the Swiss team in the 90th minute and sent off CFR's goalkeeper Cristian Bălgrădean, after an alleged foul on the YB's centre-back Cédric Zesiger. At that moment, CFR Cluj was leading 1-0, thanks to a goal scored by Gabriel Debeljuh in the 84th minute. Before the last matchday, CFR Cluj was on the third place, with five points, and needed a victory against Young Boys to qualify further. Subsequently, at that score, the Romanian side was on the second place, one point above Young Boys. 

Jean-Pierre Nsame went on and scored the equaliser from the penalty kick in the 93rd minute, sending Young Boys on the second position again. Moreover, Young Boys went on and scored again in the 96th minute. The match was supposed to end after 95 minutes, but it went over and Bastien stopped almost before the 100th minute mark.

Group statistics if CFR Cluj would have won 1-0, the score in the 93rd minute.

West Ham United 3-1 FCSB
The second incident took place two years later, on September 8, 2022, in the first matchday of the 2022-23 UEFA Europa Conference League group stage. The English side West Ham United and the Romanian side FCSB, the latter one having the first appearance in the group stage of an international cup in five years, were disputing a match. FCSB was leading 1-0 in the 64th minute, when Benoît Bastien gave a very controversed penalty for the English side, after Maxwel Cornet crashed into the Romanian side goalkeeper, injuring both himself and FCSB's goalkeeper Ștefan Târnovanu. FCSB players protested for multiple minutes, but Bastien continued with the penalty, with Jarrod Bowen equalising from the penalty spot. A despondent FCSB side went on and lost 1-3, failing to win any match in the campaign and suffering tremendous defeats against both West Ham (0-3 in Bucharest) and the Danish side Silkeborg (0-5 both in Silkeborg and Bucharest).

After the match, Bastien's Wikipedia page was raided by Romanians, calling him slurs and fixing his death location as "Ghencea, Romania", and, as a result, Wikipedia had to block everyone from editing his page. He also received numerous threats, both from FCSB and CFR Cluj fans.

References

External links 
 
 
 
 

1983 births
Living people
Sportspeople from Épinal
French football referees
UEFA Europa League referees
21st-century French people
20th-century French people